Alfred Barks (June 30, 1936 - August 25, 2018) was an American baseball first baseman who played for the New York Black Yankees in .

Career
Barks attended St. Joseph High School in Norfolk, Virginia. He died in Georgia in 2018.

References

New York Black Yankees players
1936 births
2018 deaths
Baseball first basemen
Baseball players from Norfolk, Virginia
21st-century African-American people